Apoplotrechus is a genus of beetles in the family Carabidae, containing the following species:

 Apoplotrechus hollandei Mateu, 1983
 Apoplotrechus strigipennis (Fairmaire, 1903)

References

Trechinae